HMS H51 was a British H class submarine built by HM Dockyard, Pembroke Dock. She was laid down on an unknown date, launched on 15 November 1918 and commissioned into the British Royal Navy on 1 September 1919.  It had a complement of twenty-two crew members.

HMS H51 was sold for scrapping on 6 June 1924 and was then resold on 17 July 1924 to the ship breakers.

Design

H51 was fitted with an anti-aircraft gun and four  torpedo tubes. Its torpedo tubes were fitted to the bows and the submarine was loaded with eight  torpedoes. It is a Holland 602 type submarine but was designed to meet Royal Navy specifications. Its complement was twenty-two crew members.

References

Bibliography
 
 

 

British H-class submarines
Ships built in Pembroke Dock
1918 ships
Royal Navy ship names